Live is a live album by French jazz fusion artist Jean-Luc Ponty, recorded in December 1978 and released on April 18, 1979. It was reissued on Atlantic Records on CD in 1990 and 1992.

Track listing 
All songs by Jean-Luc Ponty.
"Aurora, Pt. 1" – 2:53
"Aurora, Pt. 2" – 6:18
"Imaginary Voyage, Pt. 3" – 4:25
"Imaginary Voyage, Pt. 4" – 7:09
"Mirage" – 5:46
"No Strings Attached" – 5:59
"Egocentric Molecules" – 7:26

Personnel 
 Jean-Luc Ponty – violin, piano, keyboards
 Allan Zavod – electric piano, keyboards, synthesizers
 Jamie Glaser – electric guitar
 Joaquin Lievano – electric guitar
 Ralphe Armstrong – fretless bass, bass
 Casey Scheuerell – drums, percussion

Production
 Assistant engineers (Chateau Recorders): Brian Leshon, Russ Bracher 
 Assistant engineers (Record Plant Mobile): Jimmy Sandweiss, Mark Eshelman, Walter Borchers
 Assistant engineers (Wally Heider Mobile): Billy Youdelman, Dennis Mays, Doug Field, Gray O'Dell, Les Cooper, Mike Carver, Phil McConnell, Walter Dawes
 Mastered by Stan Ricker

Recorded live in December 1978 during a concert tour in the U.S. with the Wally Heider Mobile Studio and the Record Plant Mobile Studio, both from Los Angeles, California.
Mixed at Chateau Recorders, North Hollywood, California.
Mastered at JVC Cutting Center, Hollywood, California.

Chart positions

References

External links 
 Jean-Luc Ponty - Live (1979) album rating, credits & releases at AllMusic
 Jean-Luc Ponty - Live (1979) album releases & credits at Discogs
 Jean-Luc Ponty - Live (1979) album to be listened as stream on Spotify

Jean-Luc Ponty live albums
1979 live albums
Atlantic Records live albums